Sir Alexander Gilmour, 1st Baronet (1657-1731) of Craigmillar Castle, Edinburgh, was a Scottish politician who sat in the Parliament of Scotland from 1690 to 1702.

Gilmour was baptized at Edinburgh  on 6 December 1657, the son of Sir John Gilmour, of Craigmillar, sometime Lord President of the Court of Session, and his third wife Margaret Murray, daughter of Sir Alexander Murray, 2nd Baronet of Blackbarony. He was served heir to his father on 26 September 1671. On 1 February 1678, he was created baronet. He married Grisel Ross, daughter of George Ross, 11th Lord Ross and his first wife Grisel Cochrane, daughter of William Cochrane, 1st Earl of Dundonald.

Gilmour was returned as Shire Commissioner for Edinburghshire  in 1690 and held the seat until 1702.

Gilmour died on 29 October 1731 aged 74, and was succeeded in the baronetcy by his son Charles.

References

1657 births
1731 deaths
Members of the Parliament of Scotland 1689–1702
Shire Commissioners to the Parliament of Scotland
Baronets in the Baronetage of Nova Scotia